Nikolas Constantinos Tsattalios (born 1 March 1990) is an Australian footballer who plays for Sydney Olympic FC.

Club career
Tsattalios grew up in Sydney playing for his local Carss Park Soccer Club, alongside former Sydney FC teammate Dean Bouzanis.

Sydney FC
Tsattalios made his A-League debut on 12 October 2007 against Perth Glory as a second-half substitute. He played just five games for Sydney and eventually was released by the club.

He was signed by the Newcastle Jets for the 2009 AFC Champions League on a six-month contract with the option of an extension into the A-League 2009-10 season.

Sydney Olympic
Sydney Olympic signed Tsattalios for the 2010 NSW Premier League season.

Sutherland Sharks
Tsattalios signed for the Sutherland Sharks for the 2011 NSW Premier League season.

Wellington Phoenix
On 19 July 2011, it was announced that Tsattalios had signed with the Wellington Phoenix in the A-League.

Sutherland Sharks
On 1 June 2012, Tstallios re-joined NSW Premier League club Sutherland Sharks.

International career
In 2006, he joined the NSW Institute of Sport football program leading to being named as a stand-by player for the Joeys squad for the AFC U-17 Championship 2006.

Honours 
With Australia:
 AFF U19 Youth Championship: 2008

References

External links
FFA – Young Socceroo profile

1990 births
Living people
Soccer players from Sydney
Australian people of Greek descent
Sydney FC players
A-League Men players
National Premier Leagues players
Wellington Phoenix FC players
New South Wales Institute of Sport alumni
Newcastle Jets FC players
Sydney Olympic FC players
Sutherland Sharks FC players
People educated at Endeavour Sports High School
Association football wingers
Association football fullbacks
Australian soccer players